A rotary vane pump is a type of positive-displacement pump that consists of vanes mounted to a rotor that rotates inside a cavity. In some cases these vanes can have variable length and/or be tensioned to maintain contact with the walls as the pump rotates.

This type of pump was invented by Charles C. Barnes of Sackville, New Brunswick, who patented it on June 16, 1874. There have been various improvements since, including a variable vane pump for gases (1909).

They can endure short periods of dry operation, and are considered good for low-viscosity fluids.

Types
The simplest vane pump has a circular rotor rotating inside a larger circular cavity. The centres of these two circles are offset, causing eccentricity. Vanes are mounted in slots cut into the rotor. The vanes are allowed a certain limited range of movement within these slots such that they can maintain contact with the wall of the cavity as the rotor rotates. The vanes may be encouraged to maintain such contact through means such as springs, gravity, or centrifugal force. A small amount of oil may be present within the mechanism to help create a better seal between the tips of the vanes and the cavity's wall. The contact between the vanes and the cavity wall divides up the cavity into "vane chambers" that do the pumping work. On the suction side of the pump the vane chambers are increased in volume and are thus filled with fluid forced in by the inlet vacuum pressure, which is the pressure from the system being pumped, sometimes just the atmosphere. On the discharge side of the pump the vane chambers decrease in volume, compressing the fluid and thus forcing it out of the outlet. The action of the vanes pulls through the same volume of fluid with each rotation.

Multi-stage rotary-vane vacuum pumps, which force the fluid through a series of two or more rotary-vane pump mechanisms to enhance the pressure, can attain vacuum pressures as low as 10−6 mbar (0.0001 Pa).

Uses
Vane pumps are commonly used as high-pressure hydraulic pumps and in automobiles, including supercharging, power-steering, air conditioning, and automatic-transmission pumps. Pumps for mid-range pressures include applications such as carbonators for fountain soft-drink dispensers and espresso coffee machines. Furthermore, vane pumps can be used in low-pressure gas applications such as secondary air injection for auto exhaust emission control, or in low-pressure chemical vapor deposition systems.

Rotary-vane pumps are also a common type of vacuum pump, with two-stage pumps able to reach pressures well below 10−6 bar. These are found in such applications as providing braking assistance in large trucks and diesel-powered passenger cars (whose engines do not generate intake vacuum) through a braking booster, in most light aircraft to drive gyroscopic flight instruments, in evacuating refrigerant lines during installation of air conditioners, in laboratory freeze dryers, and vacuum experiments in physics. In the vane pump, the pumped gas and the oil are mixed within the pump, and so they must be separated externally. Therefore, the inlet and the outlet have a large chamber, perhaps with swirl, where the oil drops fall out of the gas. Sometimes the inlet has louvers cooled by the room air (the pump is usually 40 K hotter) to condense cracked pumping oil and water, and let it drop back into the inlet. When these pumps are used in high-vacuum systems (where the inflow of gas into the pump becomes very low), a significant concern is contamination of the entire system by molecular oil backstreaming.

Variable-displacement vane pump 

One of the major advantages of the vane pump is that the design readily lends itself to become a variable-displacement pump, rather than a fixed-displacement pump such as a spur-gear (X-X) or a gerotor (I-X) pump.  The centerline distance from the rotor to the eccentric ring is used to determine the pump's displacement.  By allowing the eccentric ring to pivot or translate relative to the rotor, the displacement can be varied.  It is even possible for a vane pump to pump in reverse if the eccentric ring moves far enough. However, performance cannot be optimized to pump in both directions. This can make for a very interesting hydraulic-control oil pump.

A variable-displacement vane pump is used as an energy-saving device and has been used in many applications, including automotive transmissions, for over 30 years.

Materials 
 Externals (head, casing) – cast iron, ductile iron, steel, brass, plastic, and stainless steel
 Vane, pushrods – carbon graphite, PEEK
 End plates – carbon graphite
 Shaft seal – component mechanical seals, industry-standard cartridge mechanical seals, and magnetically driven pumps
 Packing – available from some vendors, but not usually recommended for thin liquid service

See also
Guided-rotor compressor
Powerplus supercharger

References

External links

U.S. Patent of a Vane Pump
H. Eugene Bassett's articulated displacer compressor
Vane Pump Animation 
Pumps
Canadian inventions